CKZY-FM is a First nations community radio station that operates at 90.3 FM in Lac Seul, Ontario.

Owned by Lac Seul Radio, the station was given approval by the Canadian Radio-television and Telecommunications Commission in 1992. At some point, CKZY-FM moved from 89.9 MHz to 90.3 MHz.

See also
Wawatay

References

External links

Kzy
Kzy
Radio stations established in 1992
1992 establishments in Ontario